Lucid Intervals and Moments of Clarity Part 2 is the first compilation album by American heavy metal musician Michael Angelo Batio. It contains remastered tracks from Batio's third and fourth studio albums, Tradition (1998) and Lucid Intervals and Moments of Clarity (2000), and was released in 2004 by M.A.C.E. Music. Three songs from Lucid Intervals and Moments of Clarity 2 have also been included on instructional video albums released by Metal Method – "China" on Performance (2006), "Prog" on Speed Kills 3 (2007), and "The Finish Line" on Performance (2006) and Speed Lives 3: The Neo Classical Zone (2009).

Track listing

Personnel
Musicians
Michael Angelo Batio – guitars, bass, keyboards, drums on tracks 1, 2, 3, 9 and 12, arrangements, programming, production, engineering, mixing
Rob Ross – drums on tracks 4, 5, 7, 8, 11, 13 and 14, vocals on track 11
William Kopecky – bass on tracks 4, 5, 8 and 11
Additional personnel
Mark Richardson – mastering
Dan Machnik – photography
Paul Kuhr – graphic design

References

Michael Angelo Batio albums
2004 compilation albums
M.A.C.E. Music albums